José Pinto Paiva (born 16 July 1938) is a Brazilian chess player, two times Brazilian Chess Championship winner (1966, 1971).

Biography
From the mid-1960s to mid-1970s, José Pinto Paiva was one of Brazil's leading chess players. He won two gold (1966, 1971), two silver (1967, 1969) and bronze (1965) medals in Brazilian Chess Championships. In 1972 José Pinto Paiva participated in World Chess Championships South American Zonal tournament.

José Pinto Paiva played for Brazil in the Chess Olympiads:
 In 1968, at second reserve board in the 18th Chess Olympiad in Lugano (+1, =0, -4),
 In 1970, at second reserve board in the 19th Chess Olympiad in Siegen (+3, =3, -2).

References

External links

José Pinto Paiva chess games at 365chess.com

1938 births
Living people
Sportspeople from Salvador, Bahia
Brazilian chess players
Chess Olympiad competitors
20th-century chess players